Ojos Negros may refer to:
 Ojos Negros, Teruel, a municipality in the province of Teruel, Aragon, Spain
 Vía Verde de Ojos Negros, the longest rail trail in Spain, which runs between the municipality of Ojos Negros in the province of Teruel and the municipality of Algímia d'Alfara in the province of Valencia, Spain
 Ojos Negros, Baja California, a town in the municipality of Ensenada, Baja California, Mexico
 Ojos Negros (Azúcar Moreno album), 1992
 Ojos Negros (Dino Saluzzi album), 2006